Pringle v Government of Ireland (2012) C‑370/12 is an EU law case, which held the European Stability Mechanism was lawful.

Facts
Thomas Pringle, an anti-austerity Independent MP (Teachta Dála) in Ireland, claimed that the European Stability Mechanism was unlawful, because it exceeded the EU’s exclusive competence for monetary policy, and went beyond the TFEU powers. The ESM was created with the ESM Treaty, signed by the euro area Member States on 2 February 2012. It was made possible by the European Council Decision 2011/199/EU that adopted, under article 48(6)TEU, a simplified Treaty revision procedure leading to the introduction of Art 136(3)TFEU containing the following text:

"The Member States whose currency is the euro may establish a stability mechanism to be activated if indispensable to safeguard the stability of the euro area as a whole. The granting of any required financial assistance under the mechanism will be made subject to strict conditionality".

On 27 September 2012, Member States created a €500bn fund aimed at providing financial assistance to those Member States heavily affected by the financial crisis (replacing the European Financial Stability Facility and the European Financial Stabilisation Mechanism). Member States could obtain the financial aid if they signed a ‘Memorandum of Understanding’.

Judgment

Irish Supreme Court
The Irish Supreme Court made a reference for preliminary ruling to the CJEU. It asked whether the simplified revision procedure could be used, if the principles of effective judicial protection and legal certainty prevented the ESM Treaty.

European Court of Justice
The CJEU held that the European Stability Mechanism was lawful.

See also

United Kingdom enterprise law

Notes

References

External links
Case summary

United Kingdom enterprise case law
Court of Justice of the European Union case law